Francisca Martínez (born October 4, 1966) is a retired female race walker from Mexico.

Personal bests
10 km: 43:50 min –  Eisenhüttenstadt, 14 May 1995
20 km: 1:37:19 hrs –  Dublin, 16 June 2001

Achievements

References

1966 births
Living people
Mexican female racewalkers
Athletes (track and field) at the 1995 Pan American Games
Pan American Games medalists in athletics (track and field)
Pan American Games bronze medalists for Mexico
Medalists at the 1995 Pan American Games